Le Bassin d'Apollon (English: The Apollon Pond) (also called in English The Fountain of Apollo or Apollo Fountain) is a fountain at the Palace of Versailles, France. Charles Le Brun designed the centerpiece depicting the Greek god Apollo rising from the sea in a four-horse chariot. A pond was dug on the site of the fountain in 1639 called "The Pond of the Swans". When King Louis XIV had it enlarged in 1671, the pond's east-west orientation and the common association of the King with Apollo prompted Le Brun  to suggest dedicating the site to Apollo. The dawn theme was popular at the time and appears on some painted ceilings in European palaces. The fountain was constructed between 1668 and 1671. 

In 2014, a same-scale replica was unveiled in Tainan, Taiwan, at the entrance of the Chimei Museum. The museum commissioned French artist Gills Perrault in 2008 to reproduce the Fountain of Apollo, same as the one in Palace of Versailles. It took three years for modern laser measuring and the plaster mold to be made in France for the reproduction sculpture, and another three years to carve the marbles in the city of Carrara, Italy.

References
 
 

Fountains in France
Versailles
Fountains in Taiwan
Buildings and structures in Tainan